Omphalotus mexicanus is a gilled basidiomycete mushroom in the family Marasmiaceae. Found in Mexico, it was described as new to science in 1984. Fruit bodies contain the compounds illudin S and illudin M.

Found in the highlands of Mexico and Central America, its fruiting bodies are an unusual dark blue tinted with yellow.

References

External links 
 

mexicanus
Fungi described in 1984
Fungi of North America
Taxa named by Gastón Guzmán